David McIlveen (born 11 February 1981) is a former Unionist politician from Northern Ireland representing the Democratic Unionist Party (DUP).

McIlveen was elected to the Northern Ireland Assembly for the North Antrim constituency in 2011. 
He is the son of Rev. David McIlveen, a well-known minister in the Free Presbyterian Church of Ulster. although he has been largely silent on many of the issues linked to his high-profile father. 

McIlveen has a keen interest in conflict studies with particular interest in The Middle East. After welcoming the release of captured Israeli soldier Gilad Shalit, he made remarks to The Newsletter claiming Palestinian prisoners were much better treated than Israelis who were snatched at the border by Hamas and given no rights afforded to them in relation to inspections from The Red Cross. Timothy Houston of Queen's University Belfast's Palestine Solidarity Society published an open letter accusing McIlveen of bias and over-looking human rights abuses.
David McIlveen claims "close ties with Israel" following boyhood visits with his father, and has visited the region both personally and with political delegations on numerous occasions.

From August 2015-May 2017, he was a Political Member of the Northern Ireland Policing Board.

David McIlveen did not campaign publicly with his party for the 2016 Brexit referendum and described himself as a reformist rather than leave supporter.

Since leaving politics in 2017 McIlveen has returned to private sector and runs various companies mainly aligned to the property sector. He now resides outside of Northern Ireland.

References

1981 births
Living people
Democratic Unionist Party MLAs
Northern Ireland MLAs 2011–2016